Castillo de San Romualdo is a castle located in San Fernando in the Province of Cádiz, Andalusia, Spain. Built in the Mudéjar style, it was first mentioned in 1268.
It is a protected monument on the Bien de Interés Cultural register.

References

Buildings and structures completed in the 13th century
Buildings and structures in San Fernando, Cádiz
Castles in Andalusia
Bien de Interés Cultural landmarks in the Province of Cádiz